Zalingei or Zalinjay is a town in Western Sudan, and is capital of the state of Central Darfur.  As of 2009 it had an estimated population of 27,258.

The town is home to the University of Zalingei.

Transports 
The city is served by the Zalingei Airport .

Climate 
Köppen-Geiger climate classification system classifies its climate as hot semi-arid (BSh). The daytime temperatures are always hot and are the hottest in March, April and May when they may reach . The rainy season is in the middle of the year when the temperature difference between day and night is the least, when the daytime temperatures are cooler but still hot and is the coolest in August.

References

Populated places in Central Darfur
State capitals in Sudan